Osovets is a rural locality (a selo) in Kopninskoye Rural Settlement, Sobinsky District, Vladimir Oblast, Russia. The population was 216 as of 2010.

Geography 
Osovets is located 29 km southwest of Sobinka (the district's administrative centre) by road. Tsepelevo is the nearest rural locality.

References 

Rural localities in Sobinsky District